Arthur Bartlett Maurice (1873–1946) was an American editor, born in Rahway, New Jersey, and educated at Richmond College (VA), and at Princeton. He served as an editor of the Woodbridge (NJ) Register in 1895, as city editor of the Elizabeth (NJ) Daily Herald in 1896, and as special writer for the New York Commercial Advertiser in 1897–98. At The Bookman, he was joint editor from 1899 to 1909 and editor thereafter. He contributed to the New International Encyclopædia and wrote New York in Fiction (1901) and History of the Nineteenth Century in Caricature (1904), with F. T. Cooper.

External links 
 
 
 

1873 births
1946 deaths
People from Rahway, New Jersey
Editors of New York City newspapers